Joshua Fales represented Dedham, Massachusetts in the Great and General Court.

References

Works cited

Members of the Massachusetts General Court
Year of birth missing
Year of death missing